The St. Louis Islamic Center (STLIC) is a Bosnian Islamic organization and mosque in St. Louis, Missouri, founded in early 2010. STLIC is part of the Islamic Community of North America Bosniaks (ICNAB) and it was founded due to the growing need for organization of the already matured community of Bosniaks in St. Louis. Members of STLIC established an institution that will work, together with other Bosniak institutions, to protect Bosniaks from complete alienation from religion and their tradition, with a specific emphasis on programs that will preserve the youth from complete negative assimilation. It is also focused on the religious and moral regeneration of Bosniaks in St. Louis and further.

Advisory board
The Advisory Board of St. Louis Islamic Center consists of three individuals whose primary goal is to monitor and as needed correct the work of the Jamaat Board according to civic and religious law. The Jamaat Board is responsible for the day-to-day operations of the St. Louis Islamic Center and consists of seven members.

Nur Mosque
In 2015, the St. Louis Islamic Center began the construction of a mosque, the Nur Mosque, in southern St. Louis County. The construction cost 1.5 million dollars, and the mosque opened on April 1, 2017.

See also
  List of mosques in the Americas
  Lists of mosques 
  List of mosques in the United States

References

External links

Bosnian-American culture in Missouri
Mosques in Missouri
Religious buildings and structures in St. Louis
Mosques completed in 2017
Buildings and structures in St. Louis
2010 establishments in Missouri